Most (re-titled The Bridge in some countries) is a 2003 Czech live action short film directed by Bobby Garabedian, produced by Garabedian and American actor William Zabka and written by Zabka and Garbold Witnossky. The music score was created by John Debney (The Passion of the Christ).

Plot 
Most is the story of a single Czech father who takes his eight-year-old son to work with him at the railroad drawbridge where he is the bridge tender. A day before, the boy meets a woman boarding a train who has a drug problem. Back at the bridge, the father goes into the engine room, and tells his son to stay at the edge of the nearby lake. A ship comes, and the bridge is lifted. Though it is supposed to arrive an hour later, the train happens to arrive early.  The son sees this, and tries to warn his father, who is not paying attention and thus unaware of the oncoming train. Just as the oncoming train approaches, the son falls into the drawbridge gearworks while attempting to lower the bridge, leaving the father with a horrific choice to either kill his son or allow the train to crash. The father chooses to lower the bridge, the gears crushing the boy. The people in the train are completely oblivious to the fact that a boy died trying to save them, other than the woman the boy had met the day before, who happened to look out her train window. The movie ends, with the man wandering a new city and meeting a woman, holding a large baby.

Main cast 
 Vladimír Javorský as Father
 Ladislav Ondřej as Láďa
 Linda Rybová as Troubled Girl
 Chloe Wilson as Sad Person
 Ester Geislerová as Ester
 Brad Heller as Brad from America
 Klára Issová as Pavlinka
 John Lavachielli

Awards 
 2003 Sundance Film Festival: Official Selection
 Palm Springs International 2003: Winner – Best of Festival
 Maui Film Festival 2003: Winner – Best Short Film; Audience Award – Best Newcomers
 Heartland Film Festival 2003: Winner – Crystal Heart Award
 Nominated for the Academy Award for Best Live Action Short Film.

References

External links 
 
 Most on YouTube

2003 short films
2003 films
2003 drama films
2000s Czech-language films
Films about bridges
Czech drama films
Films scored by John Debney
2000s English-language films
American drama short films
2000s American films
2000s Czech films